Spolu is a Czech centre-right political alliance formed for the 2021 legislative election, composed of the Civic Democratic Party, KDU-ČSL, and TOP 09. As of the 2021 Czech election it governs the Czech Republic in a coalition with the Pirates and Mayors alliance.

History
Following the 2020 regional elections, the Civic Democratic Party (ODS), KDU-ČSL and TOP 09 began negotiations about a potential centre-right electoral alliance for the 2021 legislative election.

The ODS leadership agreed to form an alliance with the other parties on 25 October 2020. Two days later party leaders Petr Fiala, Marian Jurečka and Markéta Pekarová Adamová signed a memorandum and announced that ODS, KDU-ČSL and TOP 09 would form an electoral alliance for the next legislative election, with ODS leader Fiala as the alliance's candidate for Prime Minister. On 11 November 2020, the parties agreed that ODS would nominate the leaders of the election lists in nine regions, KDU-ČSL in three regions, and TOP 09 in two regions. The alliance was known by media as the Three Coalition, but on 9 December 2020 the parties announced that they would run under the name Spolu ("Together").

Spolu introduced its electoral programme and campaign on 9 December 2020. Ahead of the election, opinion polls suggested that ANO 2011 would win, but in an electoral upset Spolu won the highest number of votes, and opposition parties won a majority of seats in the Chamber of Deputies. The opposition parties signed a memorandum agreeing to nominate Spolu leader Petr Fiala for the position of Prime Minister. On 9 November, President Miloš Zeman formally asked Fiala to form a new government. On 17 November 2021, Fiala introduced Zeman to his proposed cabinet and Zeman agreed to appoint Fiala as the new Prime Minister on 26 November 2021. 

In November 2021 Petr Fiala said he would like to continue with the Spolu coalition into the 2022 Senate and municipal elections. On 14 June 2022 Spolu announced that the coalition would nominate 19 candidates in the senate elections. Spolu also collaborated in municipal elections in some cities and towns, including Prague, Ostrava and Plzeň.

In the 2023 Czech presidential election, Spolu endorsed three candidates: Petr Pavel, Danuše Nerudová, and Pavel Fischer.

Composition

Regional leaders in the 2021 election

Election results

Senate

Presidential

Local election

Prague municipal elections

Footnotes

Political parties established in 2020
Political party alliances in the Czech Republic
Civic Democratic Party (Czech Republic)
KDU-ČSL
TOP 09
Conservative parties in the Czech Republic
2020 establishments in the Czech Republic
2021 Czech legislative election